The Regional Council of Basilicata (Consiglio Regionale della Basilicata) is the legislative assembly of Basilicata.

It was first elected in 1970, when the ordinary regions were instituted, on the basis of the Constitution of Italy of 1948.

Composition
The Regional Council of Basilicata was originally composed of 30 regional councillors. Following the decree-law n. 138 of 13 August 2011 the number of regional councillors was reduced to 20, with an additional seat reserved for the President of the Region.

Political groups
The Regional Council of Basilicata is currently composed of the following political groups:

See also
Regional council
Politics of Basilicata
President of Basilicata

References

External links
Regional Council of Basilicata

Politics of Basilicata
Italian Regional Councils
Basilicata